Jassim Mohammed Haji (born 3 May 1984) is an Iraqi footballer who plays as a defender for Iraqi club Duhok.

He is formerly a member of the Iraq national team.

Honours 
Duhok
 2009–10 Iraqi Premier League: Champions

Iraq
 2006 Asian Games Silver medallist.

Iraq Police
 2002 Arab Police Championship: Champions

External links 
Player profile - kooora.com
Player profile - doha-2006.com
 http://goal.sportal.com.au/players/jassim-mohammed-suliman/179333/

Iraqi footballers
Iraqi Kurdish people
1984 births
People from Duhok
Living people
Kurdish sportspeople
Duhok SC players
Asian Games medalists in football
Footballers at the 2006 Asian Games
Association football defenders
Asian Games silver medalists for Iraq
Medalists at the 2006 Asian Games
Iraq international footballers